Palaephatus fusciterminus is a moth of the  family Palaephatidae. It is found in the Valdivian forests of southern Argentina and Chile.

The length of the forewings is 10–12 mm for males and 10.5–11.5 mm for females. Adults have a buff to brown head and thorax and dark brownish fuscous forewings with a pale buff hindmargin. They are on wing from October to March, possibly in multiple generations per year.

Etymology
The specific name is derived from Latin fuscus (meaning dark or swarthy) and terminus (meaning end or limit) and refers to the predominantly dark termen of the forewings.

References

Moths described in 1986
Palaephatidae
Taxa named by Donald R. Davis (entomologist)